Kevin Anderson was the competition's defending champion, but lost in the final from Novak Djokovic.

Seeds

Draw

Draw

Play-offs

References

External links
Official website

World Tennis Championship
2018 in Emirati tennis
World Tennis Championship
December 2018 sports events in Asia